This is a list of the mammal species recorded in Gibraltar. There are twenty-four mammal species in Gibraltar, of which one is critically endangered, one is endangered, three are vulnerable, and one is near threatened.

The following tags are used to highlight each species' conservation status as assessed by the International Union for Conservation of Nature:

Order: Chiroptera (bats)

Suborder: Microchiroptera
Family: Vespertilionidae
Genus: Myotis
 Greater mouse-eared bat, Myotis myotis  extirpated
Genus: Pipistrellus
 Soprano pipistrelle, Pipistrellus pygmaeus 
Genus: Miniopterus
 Schreibers' long-fingered bat, Miniopterus schreibersii 
Family: Molossidae
Genus: Tadarida
 European free-tailed bat, Tadarida teniotis 
Family: Rhinolophidae
Subfamily: Rhinolophinae
Genus: Rhinolophus
Greater horseshoe bat, R. ferrumequinum  extirpated
 Lesser horseshoe bat, R. hipposideros  extirpated

Order: Primates (monkeys, lemur-relatives, lemurs and apes)
Family: Cercopithecidae
Genus: Macaca
 Barbary macaque, M. sylvanus  introduced

Order: Carnivora (carnivores)

Family: Canidae (dogs and foxes)
Genus: Vulpes
 Red fox, Vulpes vulpes  extirpated

Infraorder (Order: Artiodactyla): Cetacea (dolphins and whales)

Suborder: Mysticeti
Family: Balaenopteridae (rorquals)
Genus: Balaenoptera
 Fin whale, Balaenoptera physalus 
 Common minke whale, Balaenoptera acutorostrata 
Suborder: Odontoceti
Family: Physeteridae (sperm whales)
Genus: Physeter
 Sperm whale, Physeter macrocephalus 
Family: Ziphiidae (beaked whales)
Genus: Ziphius
 Cuvier's beaked whale, Ziphius cavirostris 
Family: Delphinidae (marine dolphins)
Genus: Tursiops
 Common bottlenose dolphin, Tursiops truncatus 
Genus: Steno
 Rough-toothed dolphin, Steno bredanensis 
Genus: Stenella
 Striped dolphin, Stenella coeruleoalba 
Genus: Delphinus
 Short-beaked common dolphin, Delphinus delphis 
Genus: Grampus
 Risso's dolphin, Grampus griseus 
Genus: Globicephala
 Long-finned pilot whale, Globicephala melas 
Genus: Orcinus
 Orca, Orcinus orca

Order: Rodentia (rodents)
Family: Muridae (rats and mice)
Genus: Rattus
 Black rat, Rattus rattus  introduced
 Brown rat, Rattus norvegicus  introduced
Genus: Mus
 House mouse, Mus musculus

Order: Lagomorpha (rabbits and hares)

Family: Leporidae
Genus: Oryctolagus
 European rabbit, Oryctolagus cuniculus

Order: Artiodactyla (even-toed ungulates) 
The even-toed ungulates are ungulates whose weight is borne about equally by the third and fourth toes, rather than mostly or entirely by the third as in perissodactyls. There are about 220 artiodactyl species, including many that are of great economic importance to humans.
Family: Bovidae (bovids)
Subfamily: Caprinae
 Iberian ibex, C. pyrenaica  extirpated
 Southeastern Spanish ibex, C. p. pyrenaica extirpated

See also

 Barbary macaques in Gibraltar
 List of birds of Gibraltar
 List of chordate orders
 Lists of mammals by region
 Mammal classification
 List of mammals described in the 2000s

References

Gibraltar
Gibraltar-related lists
Fauna of Gibraltar
Gibraltar